Presidents of the Regional Government of Madeira are the heads of government for the autonomous local authority of Madeira, since the Carnation Revolution that installed the democratic Third Portuguese Republic. The list below includes the leaders of the transitional regimes and those presidents designated after the institutionalization of the autonomy statute that provided archipelago with its laws and democratic rights.

Following the first elections, held on 27 June 1976, the leader of the first party was installed as first President of the Regional Government of Madeira (Jaime Ornelas Camacho), responsible for forming his executive and cabinet to administer the functioning of the public service in Madeira.

Presidents
The numbering reflects the uninterrupted terms in office served by each president. For example, Alberto João Jardim served for ten consecutive terms and is counted as the second president (not the seventh, eighth, ninth or tenth president): the Roman numerals refer to the legislature that their terms encompassed. Carlos Manuel de Azeredo and Joaquim Miguel Duarte Silva served as presidents of the Regional Junta, the provisional government that functioned during the transition towards democracy.

The current President of the Regional Government of Madeira is Miguel Albuquerque, whose party won the 2015 Madeira regional election on 29 March 2015.

The colors indicate the political affiliation of each President.

Timeline

See also
Regional Government of Madeira

References
Notes

Sources
 

 
Politics of Portugal
Madeira-related lists